Humberto Viviani Ribera (born 10 December 1980) is a Bolivian football manager and former player who played as a defender.

Career
Born in Riberalta, Viviani represented Chaco Petrolero, The Strongest, Pompeya, Aurora and Universitario Sucre in a professional output. He subsequently represented amateur sides Fancesa, Ciclón Tarija, Enrique Happ, Municipal Tiquipaya and Oruro Royal. He retired in 2014 with Tiquipaya.

In 2019, after working at Enrique Happ's youth categories and as an assistant manager at Arauco Prado, Viviani was appointed manager of Atlético Palmaflor. He achieved a first-ever promotion to the Primera División in his first season, but was sacked on 9 December 2020, after a poor run of form.

On 18 December 2020, Viviani was named manager of former club Aurora.

References

External links

1980 births
Living people
Bolivian footballers
Association football defenders
Bolivian Primera División players
The Strongest players
Club Aurora players
Universitario de Sucre footballers
Club Atlético Ciclón players
Bolivian football managers
Bolivian Primera División managers
C.D. Palmaflor del Trópico managers
Club Aurora managers